José Milton Benedito, also known as Miltão (1 July 1950 – 22 December 2003) was a Brazilian professional football player. He has been the topscorer of the 1979 Copa Libertadores with 6 goals.

Club career
After having played at youth level for Estrela de Piquete, a small club based in the São Paulo state, he transferred to Sociedade Esportiva Tiradentes, a Piauí club that played in the first level of Brazilian football. His first season in the Brasileirão (which was then simply called Campeonato Nacional, National Championship) was the 1974 tournament. He then moved to Sport Recife, and he stayed there for 4 seasons, playing 66 games and scoring 22 goals. In 1979, he played for Guarani, both in the National championship (only 2 appearances) and the Copa Libertadores: during the latter tournament he scored 6 goals, finishing as the topscorer along Peruvian Juan José Oré. After his experience with Guarani, he played for Vila Nova, a Goiânia-based club, and he played one last season in Série A with Tuna Luso in 1984.

References

External links
Career at Mamvs.narod.ru

1950 births
2003 deaths
Brazilian footballers
Guarani FC players
Vila Nova Futebol Clube players
Tuna Luso Brasileira players
Association football forwards